Lindsay Johnston (born 6 March 1964) is an Australian former professional rugby league footballer. Johnston was originally from Gunnedah.

He played for the North Sydney Bears, Eastern Suburbs and South Sydney Rabbitohs as well as the English club, Hull KR. Johnston primarily played in the prop-forward position.

Johnston was selected to represent New South Wales as a prop-forward for games II and III of the 1983 State of Origin series.

References

Australian rugby league players
New South Wales Rugby League State of Origin players
North Sydney Bears players
Sydney Roosters players
South Sydney Rabbitohs players
Living people
1964 births
Rugby league props